Joslyn Tinkle (born December 29, 1990) is an American professional basketball player who most recently played for Seattle Storm of the WNBA. She is the daughter of men's head coach Wayne Tinkle of Oregon State University.

Early life
Tinkle was born in Stockholm, Sweden, and she lived in Europe for eight years. Her family then moved to Montana where she attended Big Sky High School in Missoula.

Career
Tinkle played college basketball for Stanford University.

Stanford statistics
Source

USA Basketball
Tinkle was a member of the USA Women's U18 team which won the gold medal at the FIBA Americas Championship in Buenos Aires, Argentina. The event was held in July 2008, when the USA team defeated host Argentina to win the championship. Tinkle helped the team win all five games, averaging 7.2 points per game.

Professional
She signed with Seattle on August 24, 2013.

Coaching career
Tinkle was hired to be an assistant coach for the Montana Grizzlies women's basketball team in 2021, where her parents played for the Grizzlies in the 1980's.

Personal life
Joslyn is the daughter of Wayne Tinkle, former professional basketball player in Europe and current head coach at Oregon State University. She has a sister, Elle, who played for Gonzaga University in Spokane, Washington, and a brother, Tres, who played for their father at Oregon State. Joslyn graduated from Stanford with a double major in Communications and Sociology.

References

1990 births
Living people
American expatriate basketball people in Australia
American expatriate basketball people in Hungary
American expatriate basketball people in Turkey
Basketball players from Montana
McDonald's High School All-Americans
Parade High School All-Americans (girls' basketball)
Seattle Storm players
Sportspeople from Stockholm
Swedish expatriate sportspeople in Australia
Swedish expatriate sportspeople in Hungary
Swedish expatriate sportspeople in Turkey
Stanford Cardinal women's basketball players
Forwards (basketball)